A car parking system is a mechanical device that multiplies parking capacity inside a parking lot.  Parking systems are generally powered by electric motors or hydraulic pumps that move vehicles into a storage position.

Car parking systems may be traditional or automated.  Automatic multi-storey automated car park systems are less expensive per parking slot, since they tend to require less building volume and less ground area than a conventional facility with the same capacity.  In the long term, automated car parking systems are likely to be more cost effective than traditional parking garages.  Car parking systems reduce exhaust gas — cars need not drive around in search of street parking spaces.

Operation
Automated car parking systems use a similar type of technology to that used for mechanical parcel handling and document retrieval. The driver leaves the car inside an entrance area and technology parks the vehicle at a designated area. Hydraulic or mechanical car lifters raise the vehicle to another level for proper storing. The vehicle can be transported vertically (up or down) and horizontally (left and right) to a vacant parking space until the car is needed again. When the vehicle is needed, the process is reversed and the car lifts transport the vehicle back to the same area where the driver left it. In some cases, a turntable may be used to position the car so that the driver can conveniently drive away without the need to back up.

History
Over the years, car parking systems and the accompanying technologies have increased and diversified. Car parking systems have been around almost since the time cars were invented. In any area where there is a significant amount of traffic, there are car parking systems. Car Parking systems were developed in the early 20th century in response to the need for storage space for vehicles.

In the 1920s, forerunners of automated parking systems appeared in U.S. cities like Los Angeles, Chicago, New York City and Cincinnati. Some of these multi-storey structures are still standing, and have been adapted for new uses. One of the Kent Automatic Garages in New York (now known as the Sofia Apartments) is an Art Deco landmark that was converted into offices and luxury condominiums in 1983. A system that is now found all over Japan — the “ferris-wheel,” or paternoster system — was created by the Westinghouse Corporation in 1923 and subsequently built in 1932 on Chicago’s Monroe Street. The Nash Motor Company created the first glass-enclosed version of this system for the Chicago Century of Progress Exhibition in 1933, and it was the precursor to a more recent version, the Smart Car Towers in Europe.

Benefits
There are several advantages of employing a car park system for urban planners, business owners and vehicle drivers. They offer convenience for vehicle users and efficient usage of space for urban-based companies. Automated car park systems save time, money, space and simplify the often tedious task of parking. Auto car lifts move vehicles into safe and secure storage areas until they are needed.

Maintenance and service

Service intervals vary for automated car parking systems, depending on the type of machines used and their usage. Parking systems should be serviced at least once a year, and up to four times a year for high traffic areas or for valet parking. In addition, regular cleaning is mandatory to keep the car parking system in great working order, especially with the problems posed by weather; salt on the road can spread to lifter platforms and cause corrosion if not removed.  A reputable car parking company will regularly clean all critical elements of its automated parking system, including the car lifters top and bottom, all concrete pits, all posts resting on the concrete, and the entire concrete floor in the parking area.

References

External links 
 

Parking
Car costs